The Greek Volleyball Cup began with 1980–81 season. It is organized by Hellenic Volleyball Federation. The competition was not held sometimes in the past for financial reasons . Olympiacos won the first Cup in 1981 and is the most successful club, having won the title 16 times. PAOK are the current Cup holders.

In season 2008–09, it was carried out the final four tournament, but the tournament wasn't carried out and the next years because of riots in the place of final four's tournament, between the fans of Olympiacos and Panathinaikos. By the season 2011–12, the final four tournament is taken place again. From 2003 to 2012 in the competitions were taking part clubs of first division only. From 2013 takes part clubs of all divisions.

Finals

Notes:
• In 1987, teams from the 1st Division did not take part.
• The 1986, 1988, 1991, 1995, 1996 editions were not held for financial reasons.
• In 1998, final 4 was established. In the period 2003−07, final 8 were held.

Titles by club

MVP by edition
 1997–98 –  Marios Giourdas
 1998–99 –  Vasileios Kournetas
 1999–00 –  Andrej Kravárik
 2000–01 –  Marios Giourdas (x2) 
 2001–02 –  Tom Hoff
 2002–03 –  Jorge Elgueta
 2003–04 –  Nikolay Jeliazkov
 2004–05 –  Marios Giourdas (x3) 
 2005–06 –  Clayton Stanley
 2006–07 –  Dante Amaral
 2007–08 –  Liberman Agámez
 2008–09 –  Konstantinos Christofidelis
 2009–10 –  Liberman Agámez (x2) 
 2010–11 –  Rolando Despaigne
 2011–12 –  Rolando Despaigne (x2) 
 2012–13 –  Boyan Yordanov
 2013–14 –  Boyan Yordanov (x2) 
 2014–15 –  Vasileios Kournetas (x2) 
 2015–16 –  Dimitrios Soultanopoulos
 2016–17 –  Konstantin Čupković
 2017–18 –  Rafail Koumentakis
 2018–19 –  Garrett Muagututia
 2021–22 –  Rafail Koumentakis (x2)

References

External links
Hellenic Volleyball Federation

Volleyball in Greece